The Drexel Dragons wrestling team represents collegiate wrestling at Drexel University. The team currently competes in the Eastern Intercollegiate Wrestling Association in Division I of the National Collegiate Athletic Association (NCAA) and hold home matches at the Daskalakis Athletic Center in Philadelphia, Pennsylvania.

History

Drexel's primary conference, the Colonial Athletic Association (CAA), sponsored wrestling until 2013. Conference realignment and movement by other CAA teams ended CAA sponsorship of wrestling.

Drexel has two NCAA All-Americans to its credit: Rob Rebmann in 2004 and Ryan Hluschak in 2007.

References

External links
 

 
Wrestling in Pennsylvania
1947 establishments in Pennsylvania
Sports clubs established in 1947